In number theory, the partition function  represents the number of possible partitions of a non-negative integer .

No closed-form expression for the partition function is known, but it has both asymptotic expansions that accurately approximate it and recurrence relations by which it can be calculated exactly. It grows as an exponential function of the square root of its argument. The multiplicative inverse of its generating function is the Euler function; by Euler's pentagonal number theorem this function is an alternating sum of pentagonal number powers of its argument.

Srinivasa Ramanujan first discovered that the partition function has nontrivial patterns in modular arithmetic, now known as Ramanujan's congruences. For instance, whenever the decimal representation of  ends in the digit 4 or 9, the number of partitions of  will be divisible by 5.

Definition and examples
For a positive integer ,  is the number of distinct ways of representing  as a sum of positive integers. For the purposes of this definition, the order of the terms in the sum is irrelevant: two sums with the same terms in a different order are not considered to be distinct.

By convention , as there is one way (the empty sum) of representing zero as a sum of positive integers. Furthermore  when  is negative.

Until March 2022, this was also the largest prime that has been proved using elliptic curve primality proving.

Generating function

The generating function for p(n) is given by

The equality between the products on the first and second lines of this formula
is obtained by expanding each factor  into the geometric series 
To see that the expanded product equals the sum on the first line,
apply the distributive law to the product. This expands the product into a sum of monomials of the form  for some sequence of coefficients
, only finitely many of which can be non-zero.
Therefore, the sum equals the product.

The function that appears in the denominator in the third and fourth lines of the formula is the Euler function. The equality between the product on the first line and the formulas in the third and fourth lines is Euler's pentagonal number theorem.
The pattern of positive and negative signs in the third line comes from the term  in the fourth line: even choices of  produce positive terms, and odd choices produce negative terms.

This result is due to Leonhard Euler. The formulation of Euler's generating function is a special case of a -Pochhammer symbol and is similar to the product formulation of many modular forms, and specifically the Dedekind eta function.

Recurrence relations
The same sequence of pentagonal numbers appears in a recurrence relation for the partition function:

Although the sum on the right side appears infinite, it has only finitely many nonzero terms,

Another recurrence relation for  can be given in terms of the sum of divisors function :

Congruences 

Srinivasa Ramanujan is credited with discovering that the partition function has nontrivial patterns in modular arithmetic.
For instance the number of partitions is divisible by five whenever the decimal representation of  ends in the digit 4 or 9, as expressed by the congruence

For instance, the number of partitions for the integer 4 is 5.
For the integer 9, the number of partitions is 30; for 14 there are 135 partitions. This congruence is implied by the more general identity

also by Ramanujan, where the notation  denotes the product defined by

A short proof of this result can be obtained from the partition function generating function.

Ramanujan also discovered congruences modulo 7 and 11:

The first one comes from Ramanujan's identity

However, there is no congruence of the form  for any prime b other than 5, 7, or 11. In the 1960s, A. O. L. Atkin of the University of Illinois at Chicago discovered additional congruences of this form for small prime moduli. For example:

 proved that there are such congruences for every prime modulus greater than 3. Later,  showed there are partition congruences modulo every integer coprime to 6.

Approximation formulas

Approximation formulas exist that are faster to calculate than the exact formula given above.

An asymptotic expression for p(n) is given by
This asymptotic formula was first obtained by G. H. Hardy and Ramanujan in 1918 and independently by J. V. Uspensky in 1920.

Hardy and Ramanujan obtained an asymptotic expansion with this approximation as the first term:

where

The function  is a Dedekind sum.

As an example, Hardy and Ramanujan showed that  is the nearest integer to the sum of the first  terms of the series.

It is

The proof of Rademacher's formula involves Ford circles, Farey sequences, modular symmetry and the Dedekind eta function.

It may be shown that the th term of Rademacher's series is of the order

so that the first term gives the Hardy–Ramanujan asymptotic approximation.

This is near-optimal in that it matches the number of digits of the result.

Strict partition function

Definition and properties 

A partition in which no part occurs more than one is called strict, or is said to be a partition into distinct parts. The function q(n) gives the number of these strict partitions of the given sum n. For example, q(3) = 2 because the partitions 3 and 1 + 2 are strict, while the third partition 1 + 1 + 1 of 3 has repeated parts.  The number q(n) is also equal to the number of partitions of n in which only odd summands are permitted.

Generating function 
The generating function for the numbers q(n) is given by a simple infinite product:

where the notation  represents the Pochhammer symbol   From this formula, one may easily obtain the first few terms :

This series may also be written in terms of theta functions as

where

and

In comparison, the generating function of the regular partition numbers p(n) has this identity with respect to the theta function:

Identities about strict partition numbers 
Following identity is valid for the Pochhammer products:

 

From this identity follows that formula:

 

Therefore those two formulas are valid for the synthesis of the number sequence p(n):

 
 

In the following, two examples are accurately executed:

Restricted partition function 

More generally, it is possible to consider partitions restricted to only elements of a subset A of the natural numbers (for example a restriction on the maximum value of the parts), or with a restriction on the number of parts or the maximum difference between parts. Each particular restriction gives rise to an associated partition function with specific properties. Some common examples are given below.

Euler and Glaisher's theorem 

A theorem from Euler shows that the number of strict partitions is equal to the number of partitions with only odd parts: for all n, . This is generalized as Glaisher's theorem, which states that the number of partitions with no more than d-1 repetitions of any part is equal to the number of partitions with no part divisible by d.

Gaussian binomial coefficient 

Asymptotics 

Some general results on the asymptotic properties of restricted partition functions are known. If pA(n) is the partition function of partitions restricted to only elements of a subset A of the natural numbers, then:

If A possesses positive natural density α then , with 

and conversely if this asymptotic property holds for pA(n) then A has natural density α.  This result was stated, with a sketch of proof, by Erdős in 1942.

If A is a finite set, this analysis does not apply (the density of a finite set is zero).  If A has k elements whose greatest common divisor is 1, then

References

External links
 First 4096 values of the partition function 

Arithmetic functions
Integer sequences
Integer partitions